The Bangarapet–Bangalore City Express is an Express train belonging to South Western Railway zone that runs between  and  in India. It is currently being operated with 16521/16522 train numbers on a daily basis.

Service

The 16521/Bangarapet–Bangalore City Express has an average speed of 40 km/hr and covers 70 km in 1h 45m. The 16522/Bangalore City–Bangarapet Express has an average speed of 44 km/hr and covers 70 km in 1h 35m.

Route and halts 

The important halts of the train are:

Coach composition

The train has standard ICF rakes with a max speed of 110 kmph. The train consists of 13 coaches:

 10 General Unreserved
 2 Seating cum Luggage Rake

Traction

Both trains are hauled by a Royapuram Loco Shed based WAP-7 electric locomotive from Bangalore to Bangarapet and vice versa.

See also 

 Bangalore City railway station
 Bangarapet Junction railway station
 Arsikere−Mysore Passenger
 Night Queen Passenger
 Jolarpettai–Bangalore City Express
 Bangarapet–Marikuppam Passenger

Notes

References

External links 

 16521/Bangarapet–Bangalore City Express India Rail Info
 16522/Bangalore City–Bangarapet Express India Rail Info

Transport in Bangalore
Express trains in India
Rail transport in Karnataka
Railway services introduced in 2004